"A Death in the Desert" is a short story by Willa Cather. It was first published in The Scribner's in January 1903.

Plot summary
Everett is on a train from Holdrege, Nebraska to Cheyenne, Wyoming. He is a man that looks like his older prodigy brother Adriance—this similarity haunts him throughout the entire novel and robs him of his own personality. He will always be Adriance's brother.

Characters
Everett Hilgarde
Charley Gaylord
Two girls on the train.
Adriance Hilgarde
Katharine Gaylord
Maggie Gaylord
The Parson
Diana, a chaste actress in New York City.

Allusions to other works
Katharine Gaylord mentions Richard Wagner's Das Rheingold, Edward Gibbon's The History of the Decline and Fall of the Roman Empire, and Heinrich Heine's Florentine Nights.

Moreover, Gussie Davis' song "In the Baggage Coach Ahead" is mentioned - albeit 'in' is elided.

Literary significance and criticism
It has been argued that the title of the story was influenced by Willa Cather's reading of Robert Browning.

Allusions to Alexandre Dumas, fils' La dame aux camelias and Lucretius's De rerum natura have also been found.

References

External links 
Full Text at the Willa Cather Archive

1903 short stories
Short stories by Willa Cather
Works originally published in Scribner's Magazine